Erigeron irazuensis is a Central American species of flowering plant in the family Asteraceae. It has been found only in Costa Rica.

Erigeron irazuensis is  a perennial herb up to 25 cm (10 inches) tall, producing a branching underground caudex. Stems are sometimes erect (standing straight up) but other times recumbent (reclining on the ground or leaning on other vegetation). Leaves are moderately hairy, some produced close to the ground plus others higher on the stem. The plant produces flower heads on long, thin stalks. Each head contains 38-55 white or pink ray florets surrounding numerous yellow disc florets.

References

External links

irazuensis
Flora of Costa Rica
Plants described in 1904